Hawthorne Hall is a historic home located at Fincastle, Botetourt County, Virginia. It was built in 1824, and consists of a -story, double-pile, center passage-plan brick main block with Federal detailing, with a one-story brick kitchen wing.  It was restored in the 1970s.

It was listed on the National Register of Historic Places in 2000.

References

Houses on the National Register of Historic Places in Virginia
Federal architecture in Virginia
Houses completed in 1824
Houses in Botetourt County, Virginia
National Register of Historic Places in Botetourt County, Virginia